Djidji is a town in southern Ivory Coast. It is a sub-prefecture of Lakota Department in Lôh-Djiboua Region, Gôh-Djiboua District.

Djidji was a commune until March 2012, when it became one of 1126 communes nationwide that were abolished.

In 2014, the population of the sub-prefecture of Djidji was 12,375.

Villages
The 7 villages of the sub-prefecture of Djidji and their population in 2014 are:

 Béssaboua (725)
 Djidji (3 915)
 Dousséba (1 469)
 Faitaikro (773)
 Godou (2 104)
 Krikpoko (2 612)
 Niablé (777)

References

Sub-prefectures of Lôh-Djiboua
Former communes of Ivory Coast